The name Carwile is a surname that originated in England following the Norman Conquest of 1066, but is most present today in the United States of America.

Family History

The Carwile family's first place of residence was Northumberland. There, they held a family seat from quite early times, having been granted lands by William I of England following the Norman conquest of England. The surname itself is taken from the family's place of residence prior to the Norman Conquest of 1066, which was Carvile, Normandy. Due to the nature of monks and scribes in the Middle Ages, the surname Carwile can be found as having many different spellings, including Carvill, Carvel, Carvell, Carvil, Carvile, Carville, Kervel, Carvaile, Carwell as well as others; scribes and monks in the medieval an ages most commonly wrote down what they thought that a word sounded like.

The Great Migration

Faced with political and religious disarray, as well as starvation and other oppressions, many Carwiles found it attractive to emigrate to the United States, Canada, Ireland, and Austria.

Notables

 Edward Carvel (Philadelphia 1852)
 William Carvill (Philadelphia 1844)
 Patrick Carville (Philadelphia 1868)
 James Carwell and wife Margaret (Georgia 1732)
 Howard Carwile (1911–1987), Lawyer and Politician
 William (Bill) L. Carwile, III. Present Day Politician
 Jack Carwile (b. 1941) Tennessean Contractor
 John Carwile (b. 1958) American Ambassador

References